
Tarnobrzeg County is a unit of territorial administration and local government (powiat) in Subcarpathian Voivodeship, south-eastern Poland. It came into being on January 1, 1999, as a result of the Polish local government reforms passed in 1998. Its administrative seat is the city of Tarnobrzeg, although the city is not part of the county (it constitutes a separate city county).

As of 2019 its total population is 53,115, of which the population of Nowa Dęba is 11,152, that of Baranów Sandomierski is 1,456, and the rural population is 40,507.

Neighbouring counties
Apart from the city of Tarnobrzeg, Tarnobrzeg County is also bordered by Sandomierz County to the north, Stalowa Wola County to the east, Kolbuszowa County and Mielec County to the south, and Staszów County to the west.

Administrative division
The county is subdivided into four gminas (two urban-rural and two rural). These are listed in the following table, in descending order of population.

References

 
Tarnobrzeg